The , officially the , also known as the  for sponsorship reasons, is the top flight of women's association football in Japan, starting from the 2021–22 season. It is the first fully-professional women's soccer league in Japan.

History
On 3 June 2020, the Japan Football Association (JFA) announced the formation of the WE League to become Japan's new top-flight, professional women's football league. The semi-professional Nadeshiko League would become the second level on the women's football pyramid in Japan once the WE League begins play in the autumn of 2021. United States-based business executive and former Japan international footballer Kikuko Okajima was announced as the WE League's inaugural chairwoman.

17 clubs applied to join the WE League; eight to ten of them would be admitted and the results to be announced in October 2020. On 15 October 2020, 11 clubs were announced as founding members of the WE League, including seven with J. League affiliations.

Competition format
The WE League's inaugural season in 2021–22 features 11 teams playing a double round-robin, home-and-away competition. Unlike the Nadeshiko League, the WE League will play a winter season that conforms with most European leagues. Similar to the American National Women's Soccer League, there will be no relegation from the WE League to the Nadeshiko League, but teams may be promoted from the latter in the first several seasons for the WE League to reach a desired number of teams.

Each team in the WE League must have at least five players signed to fully professional contracts that are not subject to a salary cap. In addition to bringing professionalism to Japanese women's football, the WE League also implemented measures to bringing in international players. The JFA subsidizes salaries for players from Southeast Asian member federations, while the league itself subsidizes players from top-ranked FIFA countries. The league actively recruits players from top-ranked federations such as France, Germany, the Netherlands, and the United States, and it also provides additional subsidies to encourage internationalization for expenses such as interpreters.

Clubs

2022–23 season
The following 11 clubs will be competing in the WE League during its inaugural, 2022–23 season.

List of winners

Sponsorship

Title partner

Gold partner/grassroots partner

Silver partner

Official broadcasting partner

Official equipment partner

Official ticketing partner

See also

Japan Football Association (JFA)
Nadeshiko League (tiers 2–3)
Empress's Cup (national cup)
WE League Cup (league cup)
AFC Women's Club Championship (continental cup)

References

External links
WE League – official website 

Japan Football Association (JFA) 

Japan
1
Football leagues in Japan
Sports leagues in Japan
Professional sports leagues in Japan
WE League